The 1959–60 Ranji Trophy was the 26th season of the Ranji Trophy. Bombay won the title defeating Mysore in the final.

Highlights
 Asif Iqbal made his first class debut for Hyderabad against Kerala. He moved to Pakistan two years later and captained them in Test cricket.

Group stage

South Zone

Central Zone

North Zone

West Zone

East Zone

Knockout stage

Final

Scorecards and averages
Cricketarchive

References

External links

1960 in Indian cricket
Ranji Trophy seasons